Yunio Lastre Hechevarría (or Yunior Lastre Hechavarría, born 26 October 1981, in Santiago de Cuba, Santiago de Cuba) is a Cuban discus thrower. His personal best throw is 63.67 metres, achieved in March 2009 in Havana.

Career
He won the gold medal at the 2005 Central American and Caribbean Championships and at the 2006 Central American and Caribbean Games.

Personal best
Shot put: 17.60 m –  La Habana, 17 February 2012
Discus throw: 65.17 m –  La Habana, 29 June 2012

Achievements

References

External links
 

1981 births
Living people
Athletes (track and field) at the 2011 Pan American Games
Cuban male discus throwers
Athletes (track and field) at the 2012 Summer Olympics
Olympic athletes of Cuba
Central American and Caribbean Games gold medalists for Cuba
Competitors at the 2006 Central American and Caribbean Games
Central American and Caribbean Games medalists in athletics
Pan American Games competitors for Cuba
Sportspeople from Santiago de Cuba